Camille Montpetit was the second Deputy Clerk of the House of Commons of Canada, having served from 1998 to 1999. He and Robert Marleau coedited the first edition of House of Commons Procedure and Practice which was published in 2000.

Published works 
 

Canadian civil servants
Legislative clerks
Year of birth missing
Possibly living people